Fisher Ames (April 9, 1758 – July 4, 1808) was a Representative in the United States Congress from the 1st Congressional District of Massachusetts. He was an important leader of the Federalist Party in the House, and was noted for his oratorical skill.

Personal life
Ames was born in Dedham in the Province of Massachusetts Bay. His father, Dr. Nathaniel Ames, died when Fisher was but six years old, but his mother, Deborah Fisher resolved, in spite of her limited income, to give the boy a classical education. He belonged to one of the oldest families in Massachusetts and in his line of his ancestry was Rev. William Ames. At the age of six he began the study of Latin, and at the age of twelve, he was sent to Harvard College, graduating in 1774 when he began work as a teacher. While teaching school Ames also studied law in the office of William Tudor. He was admitted to the bar, and commenced practice in Dedham in 1781.

He had a brother, also named Nathaniel Ames. He had polar opposite political views from his brother, and very different social styles as well. Nathaniel "enjoyed his role as country doctor, servant of the proletariat, and champion of the common man." He became the leader of the Democratic-Republican Party in Dedham. He was most at home around the farmers and laborers with whom he grew up. Fisher, on the other hand, liked to dress well, hobnob with Boston society, and was an influential Federalist. Fisher operated his law practice out of the first floor of the Ames Tavern.

He was elected a Fellow of the American Academy of Arts and Sciences in 1793. Ames had six children, including John, Seth, and William with his wife, Frances. Ames owned a farm on Federal Hill in Dedham that he rented out. If the weather was nice while he was home from Washington, he would walk to the farm every day to inspect the crops growing there.

Political career

Massachusetts

In 1788, he became a member of the Massachusetts convention that ratified the United States Constitution. His "lucid and persuasive" speeches in the convention helped to sway enough votes to adopt the Constitution. Later that year, he was elected to serve in the Massachusetts House of Representatives alongside Nathaniel Kingsbury.

After stepping down from Congress, he stayed in politics and was a member of the Governor's Council from 1798 to 1800. In his new role, Ames offered one of the great orations on the death of President Washington.

Federal
Ames was elected to the First United States Congress, having beaten Samuel Adams for the post. He was surprised by his win. He was a member of the Federalist Party, specifically its Essex Junto. James Madison wrote to Thomas Jefferson in 1794 that "Ames is said to owe his success to the votes of negroes and British sailors smuggled under a very lax mode of conducting the election there."

Ames also served in the Second and Third Congresses and as a Federalist to the Fourth Congress. He served in Congress from March 4, 1789, to March 3, 1797. During the First Congress, he was chairman of the Committee on Elections.  In 1796, he was not a candidate for renomination but resumed the practice of law in Dedham.

Though he was young, he was considered one of the best orators in the Congress. Ames offered one of the first great speeches in American Congressional history when he spoke in favor of the Jay Treaty. Ames vigorously defended the interests of New England, such as opposing a tax on molasses. Despite his Federalist sympathies, Ames would dissent from his party when he felt it was not in the country's best interest. For example, in 1789 Ames argued against the appointment of Thomas Willing as the President of Hamilton's newly created Bank of the United States.

In 1794, the people of Charleston, South Carolina burned him in effigy alongside William Pitt, Benedict Arnold, and the Devil for his pro-British positions.

Political opinions
Ames became concerned by the rising popularity of Jefferson's Republicans, who advocated the United States adopt Republican type representative government along the lines of post-Revolution government in France. Hamilton's Federalists (of which Ames was one), although they too agreed with a Republic, advocated a stronger federal government with similar powers to the British example. Ames felt Federalism around a clear and firm constitution was the model the United States should follow to prevent the fledgling nation from failing. He cautioned against the excesses of democracy unfettered by morals and reason: "Popular reason does not always know how to act right, nor does it always act right when it knows." He also felt that democracy alone was too fragile a system to resist descent into tyranny.  "A democracy cannot last.  Its nature ordains that its next change should be into a military despotism....The reason is that the tyranny of what is called the people, and that by the sword, both operate alike to debase and corrupt, til there are neither men left with the spirit to desire liberty, nor morals with the power to sustain justice.  Like the burning pestilence that destroys the human body, nothing can subsist by its dissolution but vermin." Likewise, Ames warned his countrymen of the dangers of flattering demagogues, who incite dis-union and lead their country into bondage:
"Our country is too big for union, too sordid for patriotism, too democratic for liberty. What is to become of it, He who made it best knows. Its vice will govern it, by practising upon its folly. This is ordained for democracies."

Views on slavery
Ames was outspokenly opposed to slavery, as were both of his parents. Ames supported the abolition of slavery in Massachusetts in the early 1780s, and advocated all newly independent states outlaw slavery in the aftermath of the American Revolution. He was personal acquaintences with Bunker Hill veterans Peter Salem and Salem Poor, which may have influenced his antislavery views as well.

Later years
In the late 18th century, Massachusetts was a solidly Federalist state.  Dedham, however, was divided between Federalists and Republicans.

Ames returned home to Dedham in 1797. Upon returning, he was alarmed by the growing number of Republicans in town, led by his brother Nathaniel, who lived next door. In 1798, he hosted a Fourth of July party for 60 residents that was complete with patriotic songs and speeches. The attendees wrote a complimentary letter to President John Adams, pledging their support should the new nation go to war with France. Referring to the XYZ Affair, they wanted France to know that "we bear no foreign yoke--we will pay no tribute."

Nathaniel Ames wrote in his diary that his brother had convinced "a few deluded people" into signing the letter by "squeezing teazing greazing" them with food and drink.  Despite his brother the Congressman's efforts, Nathaniel believed that "the Great Mass of People" in the town were with the Republicans. For his part, Fisher wrote to Secretary of State Timothy Pickering after the party that "the progress of right opinions" was winning out in Dedham over "perhaps the most malevolent spirit that exists," the Republican Party. Members of the Federalist elite continued to visit him at his Dedham home, including Alexander Hamilton on June 24, 1800.

Ames supported calling Joshua Bates as minister of the First Church and Parish in Dedham, but later left that church and became an Episcopalian.

While attending a Town Meeting in Dedham, he rose to speak and delivered one of his "oratorical gems." A laborer rose to speak after him and said "Mr. Moderator, my brother Ames' eloquence reminds me of nothing but the shining of a firefly, which gives just enough light to show its own insignificance." He then immediately sat down.

In 1805, Ames was chosen president of Harvard University. He declined to serve because of failing health. As was just about everything he did in life, Ames' death on July 4, 1808, was an annoyance to his brother Nathaniel. Nathaniel had arraigned for a funeral in Dedham and had sent details to a printer to be published. George Cabot sent an employee to speak to Ames' widow about hosting the funeral in his home. The widow agreed. Nathaniel believed Cabot's intentions were to embarrass the Town of Dedham for its Republican political views and did not attend. Ames was interred in the Old Village Cemetery.

Legacy
He is the namesake of Ames Christian University. The Ames Schoolhouse, now Dedham's Town Hall, was named for him.

Despite his limited number of years in public service, Fisher Ames ranks as one of the more influential figures of his era. Ames led Federalist ranks in the House of Representatives. His acceptance of the Bill of Rights garnered support in Massachusetts for the new Constitution. His greatest fame however may have come as an orator, for which one historian has dubbed him "the most eloquent of the Federalists."

Writings

Ames got his start in politics by writing essays in the local press under the pen names of Camillus and Lucius Junius Brutus. doing so gave him a level of notoriety beyond the confines of Dedham. He also published a number of essays, critical of Jefferson's followers.

Notable quotes
"We have but a slender hold of our virtues; they ought, therefore, to be cherished with care, and practised with diligence."
"He who holds parley with vice and dishonor, is sure to become their slave and victim."
"The heart is more than half corrupted, that does not burn with indignation at the slightest attempt to seduce it."
"No man can be a sound lawyer who is not well read in the laws of Moses."

See also
 Ames family

Notes

References

Works cited

Further reading
 Arkin, Marc M. "Regionalism and the Religion Clauses: The Contribution of Fisher Ames." Buffalo Law Review 47 (1999): 763+.
 Bernhard, Winfred E.A. Fisher Ames: Federalist and Statesman, 1758-1808. Chapel Hill: University of North Carolina Press, 1965.
 Douglass, Elisha P. "Fisher Ames, Spokesman for New England Federalism." Proceedings of the American Philosophical Society 103.5 (1959): 693–715. in JSTOR
 Farrell, James M. "Fisher Ames and political judgment: Reason, passion, and vehement style in the Jay treaty speech." Quarterly Journal of Speech 76.4 (1990): 415–434.
Dictionary of American Biography (1934): Ames, Fisher

Primary sources
Works of Fisher Ames: With a Selection from His Speeches and Correspondence. Edited by Seth Ames. 2 vols. 1854.

External links
 Fisher Ames Collection at the William L. Clements Library

1758 births
1808 deaths
Massachusetts lawyers
Members of the Massachusetts House of Representatives
Harvard College alumni
Fellows of the American Academy of Arts and Sciences
People of colonial Massachusetts
Federalist Party members of the United States House of Representatives from Massachusetts
18th-century American politicians
Members of the Massachusetts Governor's Council
Burials at Old Village Cemetery
Politicians from Dedham, Massachusetts
Lawyers from Dedham, Massachusetts